Frank Selwyn Macaulay Bennett  was a reforming dean of Chester in the first half of the 20th century and an  Anglican scholar.

He was born on 28 October 1866 and educated at Sherborne and Keble College, Oxford. He was private chaplain to Bishop Jayne of Chester and then held incumbencies at Portwood and Hawarden  before his elevation to the deanery. A man who made Chester Cathedral "the home of the Diocese, he died on 14 November 1947.

Notes

1866 births
1947 deaths
People educated at Sherborne School
Alumni of Keble College, Oxford
Deans of Chester